Resurrection Peaks is a  mountain ridge located in the Kenai Mountains, on the Kenai Peninsula, in the U.S. state of Alaska. These peaks, marked 4712' and 4665' on the USGS map, together with their ridges and glacier form a distinct group. The peaks overlook the mouth of Resurrection River into Resurrection Bay, and take their name from the bay named since 1792, and the river since 1898. Resurrection Peaks' name was officially adopted in 1969 by the United States Geological Survey.

Climate

Based on the Köppen climate classification, Resurrection Peaks are located in a subarctic climate zone with long, cold, snowy winters, and mild summers. Temperatures can drop below −20 °C with wind chill factors below −30 °C. This climate supports a spruce and hemlock forest on the lower slopes. The months May and June offer the most favorable weather for viewing.

See also

List of mountain peaks of Alaska
Geology of Alaska

References

Gallery

External links
 Resurrection Peaks Weather forecast

Mountains of Alaska
Mountains of Kenai Peninsula Borough, Alaska
Kenai Mountains-Turnagain Arm National Heritage Area
North American 1000 m summits